Daft is an Old English-derived word for silly, stupid, or mad, depending on context.

Daft may also refer to:

 Daft (album), a 1986 album by Art of Noise
 DAFT (treaty), Dutch-American Friendship Treaty, signed in 1956
 D.A.F.T.: A Story About Dogs, Androids, Firemen and Tomatoes, a collection of music videos from Daft Punk's first album Homework
 Daft, an adulterant to bulk up candy; see List of foodborne illness outbreaks by death toll

People 
 Charles Daft (1830-1915), English cricketer
 Douglas Daft (born 1943), Australian businessman
 Harry Daft (1866–1945), English footballer
 Kevin Daft (born 1975), American football coach and former professional quarterback
 Richard Daft (1835–1900), English cricketer, brother of Charles Daft
 Richard Daft (cricketer, born 1863), son of Richard Daft
 Richard L. Daft, American professor of management

See also
 Daft Punk, a French music duo